The Women's Caucus for the Modern Languages (WCML), founded in 1969, is an allied organization of the Modern Language Association (MLA) that organizes sessions at each annual meeting focusing on professional issues of concern to women. The WCML also sponsors the Florence Howe Award for outstanding feminist scholarship, and the Annette Kolodny graduate student travel grant.

External links
 Website

Women's occupational organizations
Learned societies of the United States